Connecticut Open may refer to:

 Connecticut Open (1910s event), a PGA Tour-level tournament
 Connecticut Open (golf), the state's official open
 Connecticut Open (tennis), a WTA Tour tennis tournament